A submarine-launched ballistic missile (SLBM) is a ballistic missile capable of being launched from submarines. Modern variants usually deliver multiple independently targetable reentry vehicles (MIRVs), each of which carries a nuclear warhead and allows a single launched missile to strike several targets. Submarine-launched ballistic missiles operate in a different way from submarine-launched cruise missiles.

History

Origins
The first practical design of a submarine-based launch platform was developed by the Germans near the end of World War II involving a launch tube which contained a V-2 ballistic missile variant and was towed behind a submarine, known by the code-name Prüfstand XII. The war ended before it could be tested, but the engineers who had worked on it were taken to work for the United States (Operation Paperclip) and for the Soviet Union on their SLBM programs. These and other early SLBM systems required vessels to be surfaced when they fired missiles, but launch systems eventually were adapted to allow underwater launching in the 1950-1960s. A converted Project 611 (Zulu-IV class) submarine launched the world's first SLBM, an R-11FM (SS-N-1 Scud-A, naval variant of the SS-1 Scud) on 16 September 1955. Five additional Project V611 and AV611 (Zulu-V class) submarines became the world's first operational ballistic missile submarines (SSBs) with two R-11FM missiles each, entering service in 1956–57.

The United States Navy initially worked on a sea-based variant of the US Army Jupiter intermediate-range ballistic missile, projecting four of the large, liquid-fueled missiles per submarine. Rear Admiral W. F. "Red" Raborn headed a Special Project Office to develop Jupiter for the Navy, beginning in late 1955. However, at the Project Nobska submarine warfare conference in 1956, physicist Edward Teller stated that a physically small one-megaton warhead could be produced for the relatively small, solid-fueled Polaris missile, and this prompted the Navy to leave the Jupiter program in December of that year. Soon Chief of Naval Operations Admiral Arleigh Burke concentrated all Navy strategic research on Polaris, still under Admiral Raborn's Special Project Office. All US SLBMs have been solid-fueled while all Soviet and Russian SLBMs have been liquid-fueled except for the Russian RSM-56 Bulava, which entered service in 2014.

George Washington also conducted the first successful submerged SLBM launch with a Polaris A-1 on 20 July 1960. Forty days later, the Soviet Union made its first successful underwater launch of a submarine ballistic missile in the White Sea, on 10 September 1960 from the same converted Project 611 (NATO reporting name Zulu-IV class) submarine that first launched the R-11FM. The Soviets were only a year behind the US with their first SSBN, the ill-fated K-19 of Project 658 (Hotel class), commissioned in November 1960. However, the Hotel class carried only three R-13 missiles (NATO reporting name SS-N-4) each and had to surface and raise the missile to launch. Submerged launch was not an operational capability for the Soviets until 1963, when the R-21 missile (SS-N-5) was first backfitted to Project 658 (Hotel class) and Project 629 (Golf class) submarines. The Soviet Union was able to beat the U.S. in launching and testing the first SLBM with a live nuclear warhead, an R-13 that detonated in the Novaya Zemlya Test Range in the Arctic Ocean, doing so on 20 October 1961, just ten days before the gigantic 50 Mt Tsar Bomba's detonation in the same general area. The first Soviet SSBN with 16 missiles was the Project 667A (Yankee class), which first entered service in 1967 with 32 boats completed by 1974. By the time the first Yankee was commissioned the US had built 41 SSBNs, nicknamed the "41 for Freedom".

Deployment and further development
The short range of the early SLBMs dictated basing and deployment locations. The A-3 also had three warheads that landed in a pattern around a single target. The US was much more fortunate in its basing arrangements than the Soviets. Thanks to NATO and the US possession of Guam, US SSBNs were permanently forward deployed at Advanced Refit Sites in Holy Loch, Scotland, Rota, Spain, and Guam by the middle 1960s, resulting in short transit times to patrol areas near the Soviet Union. The SSBN facilities at the Advanced Refit Sites were austere, with only a submarine tender and floating dry dock. Converted merchant ships designated T-AKs (Military Sealift Command cargo ships) were provided to ferry missiles and supplies to the sites. With two rotating crews per boat, about one-third of the total US force could be in a patrol area at any time. The Soviet bases, in the Murmansk area for the Atlantic and the Petropavlovsk-Kamchatsky area for the Pacific, required their SSBNs to make a long transit (through NATO-monitored waters in the Atlantic) to their mid-ocean patrol areas to hold the continental United States (CONUS) at risk. This resulted in only a small percentage of the Soviet force occupying patrol areas at any time, and was a great motivation for longer-range Soviet SLBMs, which would allow them to patrol close to their bases, in areas sometimes referred to as "deep bastions". These missiles were the R-29 Vysota series (SS-N-8, SS-N-18, SS-N-23), equipped on Projects 667B, 667BD, 667BDR, and 667BDRM (Delta-I through Delta-IV classes). A total of 43 Delta-class boats of all types entered service 1972–90, with the SS-N-18 on the Delta III class and the R-29RM Shtil (SS-N-23) on the Delta IV class. The new missiles had increased range and eventually multiple independently targetable reentry vehicles (MIRV), multiple warheads that could each hit a different target.

Poseidon and Trident I
Although the US did not commission any new SSBNs from 1967 through 1981, it did introduce two new SLBMs. Thirty-one of the 41 original US SSBNs were built with larger diameter launch tubes with future missiles in mind. In the early 1970s the Poseidon (C-3) missile entered service, and those 31 SSBNs were backfitted with it. Poseidon offered a massive MIRV capability of up to 14 warheads per missile. Like the Soviets, the US also desired a longer-range missile that would allow SSBNs to be based in CONUS. The SSBN facilities (primarily a submarine tender and floating dry dock) of the base at Rota, Spain were disestablished and the Naval Submarine Base King's Bay in Georgia was built for the Trident I-equipped force.

Trident and Typhoon submarines

Both the United States and the Soviet Union commissioned larger SSBNs designed for new missiles in 1981. The American large SSBN was the Ohio class, also called the "Trident submarine", with the largest SSBN armament ever of 24 missiles, initially Trident I but built with much larger tubes for the Trident II (D-5) missile, which entered service in 1990. The entire class was converted to use Trident II by the early 2000s. These were all in the Pacific, and the Guam SSBN base was disestablished; the first several Ohio-class boats used new Trident facilities at Naval Submarine Base Bangor, Washington. Eighteen Ohio-class boats were commissioned by 1997, four of which were converted as cruise missile submarines (SSGN) in the 2000s to comply with START I treaty requirements. The Soviet large SSBN was the Project 941 Akula, famous as the Typhoon-class (and not to be confused with the Project 971 Shchuka attack submarine, called "Akula" by NATO). The Typhoons were the largest submarines ever built at 48,000 tons submerged. Six Typhoons were commissioned 1981–89.

Post-Cold War
New SSBN construction terminated for over 10 years in Russia and slowed in the US with the collapse of the Soviet Union and the end of the Cold War in 1991. The US rapidly decommissioned its remaining 31 older SSBNs, with a few converted to other roles, and the base at Holy Loch was disestablished. Most of the former Soviet SSBN force was gradually scrapped under the provisions of the Nunn–Lugar Cooperative Threat Reduction agreement through 2012. By that time the Russian SSBN force stood at six Delta-IVs, three Delta-IIIs, and a lone Typhoon used as a testbed for new missiles (the R-39s unique to the Typhoons were reportedly scrapped in 2012). Upgraded missiles such as the R-29RMU Sineva (SS-N-23 Sineva) were developed for the Deltas. In 2013 the Russians commissioned the first Borei-class submarine, also called the Dolgorukiy class after the lead vessel. By 2015 two others had entered service. The US is building a replacement for the Ohio class; however, the first of the class wasn't laid down until October 2020.

Ballistic missile submarines have been of great strategic importance for the United States, Russia, and other nuclear powers since they entered service in the Cold War, as they can hide from reconnaissance satellites and fire their nuclear weapons with virtual impunity. This makes them immune to a first strike directed against nuclear forces, allowing each side to maintain the capability to launch a devastating retaliatory strike, even if all land-based missiles have been destroyed. This relieves each side of the necessity to adopt a launch on warning posture, with its attendant risk of accidental nuclear war. Additionally, the deployment of highly accurate missiles on ultra-quiet submarines allows an attacker to sneak up close to the enemy coast and launch a missile on a depressed trajectory (a non-optimal ballistic trajectory which trades off reduced throw-weight for a faster and lower path, effectively reducing the time between launch and impact), thus opening the possibility of a decapitation strike.

Types

Specific types of SLBMs (current, past and under development) include:

Non-military use
Some former Russian SLBMs have been converted into Volna and Shtil' launch vehicles to launch satellites – either from a submarine or from a launch site on land.

See also

ICBM
Comparison of ICBMs
List of ICBMs
Heavy ICBM
Nuclear warfare
Vertical launching system
Ballistic missile submarine
Intermediate-range ballistic missile
Submarine-launched cruise missile

References

External links

Navweaps.com US naval missiles index page
Navweaps.com Soviet and Russian naval missiles index page
Navweaps.com UK naval missiles index page
Video showing the launch of a Trident SLBM.
Estimated Strategic Nuclear Weapons Inventories (September 2004)
R-11 SLBM
Trident Submarines Are Killing Machines Unparalleled In Human History.
NavSource.org SSBN photo gallery index

Missile types
 
Soviet inventions